United Six is a Bollywood film directed by Mahesh bhatt. Executive Producer Fenon J Rodriguez. The film stars Parvathy Omanakuttan, Daisy Bopanna, Pooja Sharma, Luna Lahkar, Mahi etc. The film has music by Pritam. The film is produced by C.G. Patel.

Synopsis

'United Six' is the story of six girls, living in Bangkok. They are going through a tough phase in their lives. Their dreams have shattered, their aspirations crushed. In this situation, out of frustration and out of anger, they decide to rob a bank. One of the girls, Jia, who was fired from the bank for refusing to sleep with her boss, convinces the others and leads them.

They rent a bakery adjacent to the bank and start digging a tunnel which would lead them to the strong room of the bank. They start digging and soon find that it's not as easy as it seemed like. However, they continue in their mission and one by one, on one pretext or the other, the girls start getting jittery. Jia continues to motivate them but finds it getting more and more difficult with every passing hour. The meekest girl, Maddy, keeps talking negatively and attracts the ire from Jia.

As time flies by, everybody loses their zeal and force Jia to call off the mission as they know that they don't have any mental and physical energy left.

Jia tries hard but is not able to convince the others to pursue the mission. And they decide to call it a quit.

Next morning they get the shock of their life when they see the news on TV that the bank got robbed in the night and there is info that six girls are involved in the mission.

Girls are, now, in a strange situation. They don't have money but the police are after them. The police start approaching them and they start running from one place to the other. They have to reach the jetty where a launch guy would wait for them to help them escape the country. In one night they have to arrange money to pay the launch guy as well as escape the police to safely reach there. In a roller coaster ride throughout the night, they escape the police but lose Maddy on the way. They reach the jetty without any money hoping for some miracle to happen.

Somehow, Maddy manages to dig the tunnel and rob the bank all by herself, accomplishing what six people  couldn't do together, she does it all on her own.

Cast

 Parvathy Omanakuttan as Shaina
 Daisy Bopanna as Jia
 Luna Lahkar as Maddy
 Mahi as Tia
 Isha Batwe as Candy
 Pooja Sharma as Tootsie
 Russell Geoffrey Banks as News reporter

Soundtrack
The music is composed by Pritam. Lyrics are penned by Ashish Pandit.

References

External links
 
 

2011 films
2010s Hindi-language films
Films featuring songs by Pritam